The Society for Human Rights and Prisoners' Aid (SHARP) is a Pakistani non-governmental organization (NGO) that advocates on human rights issues. The organization was founded in 1999. Headquartered in Islamabad, it also has branches in Karachi, Lahore, Peshawar, Mianwali, and Rawalpindi.

References

External links 

Human rights organisations based in Pakistan
Imprisonment and detention